The Independent Electoral and Boundaries Commission (IEBC) is an independent regulatory agency that was founded in the year 2011 through the making of the Constitution of Kenya. The Commission is responsible for conducting or supervising referendums and elections to any elective body or office established by the Constitution, and any other elections as prescribed by an Act of Parliament. It was created in a provision of the 2010 constitution and the Independent Electoral and Boundaries Commission Act. Its mandate includes "the continuous registration of voters and revision of the voter's roll, the delimitation of constituencies and wards, the regulation of political parties process, the settlement of electoral disputes, the registration of candidates for elections, voter education, the facilitation of the observation, monitoring and evaluation of elections, the regulation of money spent by a candidate or party in respect of any election, the development of a code of conduct for candidates and parties, [and] the monitoring of compliance with legislation on nomination of candidates by parties."

Membership
The Commission is made up of seven commissioners and a CEO appointed by them (who also acts as the commission secretary). The commissioners are appointed by the President of Kenya and confirmed by the Kenyan Parliament. Each member serves a six-year term. By law, no Commissioner can be a member of a political party, and at least four votes are required for any official Commission action. Once appointed, the new commissioners are sworn in by the chief justice in office at the time of their appointment.

Commissioners

Current
 Nicholas Nyaranga Auje Chairperson sworn in on 19 January 2017
 Juliana Cherera - Vice Chairperson - Sworn in on 2 September 2021
 Mr. Francis Wanderi - Sworn in on 2 September 2021 
 Mr. Justus Nyang'aya-  Sworn in on 2 September 2021
 Irene Cherop- Sworn in on 2 September 2021

Source:

Immediate former
Albert Casmus Bwire June 2008 confirmed 9 November 2011
Kule Galma Godana June 2008 confirmed 9 November 2011
 Amb. Yusuf A. Nzibo June 2008 confirmed 9 November 2011
 Eng. Abdullahi Sharawe June 2008 confirmed 9 November 2011
Thomas Letangule June 2008 confirmed 9 November 2011
J. Muthoni Wangai June 2008 confirmed 9 November 2011
Mohamed Alawi Hussun June 2008 confirmed 9 November 2011
Prof. Abdi Yakub Guliye – sworn in on 19 January 2017
Molu Boya – sworn in on 19 January 2017
Ezra Chiloba 2015 Commission Secretary Appointed as Director-General of Communications Authority of Kenya
Wafula Chebukati- 2017

Offices

National office
The IEBC national office is located on the 6th Floor of Anniversary Towers, University Way in Nairobi.

Constituency offices
The Commission currently has offices in every constituency and county in the country.

Key roles
For the Kenyan general election, 2013, IEBC has appointed individuals to the following positions:

Returning Officer
These are individuals appointed by the commission for the purpose of conducting an election or a referendum at the County Level. County Returning Officers are assisted by Deputy County Returning Officers.

Constituency Returning Officer
These are individuals appointed by the commission for the purpose of conducting an election or a referendum at the Constituency-Level.
Constituency returning officers will be assisted by a Deputy Constituency Returning Officer.

Elections carried out
The Commission has the constitutional mandate to conduct and supervise referendums and elections to any elective body or office established by the Constitution, and any other elections as prescribed by an Act of Parliament.

By-Elections

General Elections

The commission organised the general election on 4 March 2013. The presidential election was petitioned at the Supreme Court of Kenya.

The IEBC's handling of the Kenyan general election, 2017, has drawn scrutiny. The Supreme Court of Kenya invalidated the first Presidential election results due to voting irregularities. Former IEBC Commissioner Roselyn Akombe also issued a statement declaring that the second Presidential election would not be a fair election.  Just before making this statement, she resigned and fled to the United States out of fear for her life.

Potential misinformation on social media platforms. 
A fake statement was circulating on Facebook claiming that the Independent Electoral and Boundaries Commission (IEBC) had issued a clarification on the distribution of 6,000 additional polling stations in Kenya ahead of the August 9, 2022 general elections. This misinformation was posted by IEBC and further looked into by PesaCheck which is East Africa’s first public finance fact-checking initiative in collaboration with Code for Africa-the continent’s largest civic technology and data journalism accelerator who found out that the statement was FAKE.

See also
Constitution of Kenya
Elections in Kenya
Political parties in Kenya
Kriegler Commission

References

External links
 

Government agencies established in 2011
Organisations based in Nairobi
Kenya
Boundary commissions
2011 establishments in Kenya